"Never Enough'" is a song released by Finnish singer Tarja Turunen from her fourth studio album Colours in the Dark. The song was released on May 31, 2013 as a lyrical video-teaser song. The track is only available as a digital version. The song, although from the Colours in the Dark album, was previously featured on the Act I : Live in Rosario live album, as the song was first played at the end of the What Lies Beneath World Tour.

Track listing
 "Never Enough" – 5:20
 "Never Enough" (Lyrical Video) – 5:20

Video
The "Never Enough" lyric video was filmed in Zlin, Czech Republic. Tarja says:

References

External links
 

2013 singles
Tarja Turunen songs
Songs written by Tarja Turunen
2013 songs